The enzyme histidinol-phosphatase (EC 3.1.3.15) catalyzes the reaction 

L-histidinol phosphate + H2O  L-histidinol + phosphate

This enzyme participates in histidine metabolism.

Nomenclature 
This enzyme belongs to the family of hydrolases, to be specific, those acting on phosphoric monoester bonds.  The systematic name is L-histidinol-phosphate phosphohydrolase. Other names in common use include histidinol phosphate phosphatase, L-histidinol phosphate phosphatase, histidinolphosphate phosphatase, HPpase, and histidinolphosphatase.

E. coli

In E. coli the enzyme encoded by the gene hisB is a fused imidazoleglycerol-phosphate dehydratase and histidinol-phosphatase.

References

Further reading 

 

EC 3.1.3
Enzymes of known structure